The canton of Pont-de-Buis-lès-Quimerch is an administrative division of the Finistère department, northwestern France. It was created at the French canton reorganisation which came into effect in March 2015. Its seat is in Pont-de-Buis-lès-Quimerch.

It consists of the following communes:
 
Daoulas
Dirinon
Le Faou
Hanvec
Hôpital-Camfrout
Irvillac
Logonna-Daoulas
Loperhet
La Martyre
Ploudiry
Pont-de-Buis-lès-Quimerch
Rosnoën
Saint-Eloy
Saint-Ségal
Saint-Urbain
Tréflévénez
Le Tréhou

References

Cantons of Finistère